The Volgograd Metrotram (Skorostnoy Tramvay, ST) is a light rail surface/subway line operating in Volgograd, Russia. It was inaugurated on 5 November 1984, and had served 50 million passengers per year at the time the 2011 extension was opened.

A subway section in the south has five underground stations and an elevated station; this section opened in two stages in 1984 and 2011, and spans .

There are two routes, ST and ST-2. Before July 2018, ST-2 terminated at 'Stadion Monolit' station, while ST terminated at 'VGTZ'. In November 2020, ST route was suspended to enable renovation of the tracks and power lines.

The Volgograd metrotram normally use right-hand running, with left-hand traffic on the underground section between TRK Europa City Mall and Pionerskaya. This was done to enable unidirectional vehicles to use island platforms. On the new underground section between Pionerskaya and Yel'shanka, only bidirectional vehicles operate, with right-handed traffic and doors on both sides.

Stations 
List of stations north to south:
 Traktornyy Zavod (Tractor Factory)
 Khlebozavod (Bakery Works)
 Vodootstoy (Water-sediment)
 Bol’nitsa Il’icha (Ilich Hospital)
 Zavod "Barrikady" (Barrikady Factory)
 Chetyrnadcataya Gimnaziya (Gymnasium No.14)
 Stadion Monolit (Monolith Stadium)
 Zavod "Krasnyy Oktyabr'" (Red October Steel Factory)
 Tridtsat' Devyataya Gvardeyskaya (39th Guards Rifle Division Street)
 Ploshchad' Vozrozhdeniya (Revival Square)
 Dvorets Sporta (Sports Palace)
 Mamayev Kurgan (Mamayev Kurgan)
 Tsentral’nyy Stadion (Central Stadium)
 Tsentral’nyy Park Kul’tury i Otdykha (Central Rest and Culture Park)
 Yevropa (Europa City Mall)
 Ploshchad' Lenina (Lenin Square)  - underground
 Komsomol’skaya (Komsomol street) - underground
 Pionerskaya (Pioneers) - elevated
 Ploshchad' Chekistov (Chekists Square) - ST branch
 Profsoyuznaya (Labour Unions)  - underground
 Teatr Yunogo Zritelya (Theatre for Young Spectators)  - underground
 Yel’shanka  - underground, ST-2 branch

 

Planned stations:
 Novosibirskaya
 Agrarnyj Universitet (Agricultural University)
 Tormosilovskaya
 Panfilovskaya
 Kuporosnaya balka (Vitriol beams)
 Gosuniversitet (State University)

References

External links

Volgograd at UrbanRail.net
Volgograd metrotram 3D – interactive Web3D model of metrotram
Volgograd Rapid Tram Underground – photos of the metrotram (with texts in Russian)
Unofficial site – site in Russian
Volgograd Metrotram Track Map – site in Russian
 video
 video

Light rail in Russia
Metrotram
Rapid transit in Russia